David Alan Tyler (born 23 January 1953) is a British business executive. , the chair of Domestic & General, and of JoJo Maman Bébé, and chair designate of PZ Cussons. He is also chair of the Parker Review. He is a former chair of Sainsbury's, Logica, and Hammerson, and a former CFO of GUS.

Personal background 
Tyler was educated at Rendcomb College from 1965 to 1970. He then read economics at Trinity Hall, Cambridge from 1971 to 1974, earning a bachelor's degree in 1974 and a master's degree in 1977. He has two children, and lives in central London and Sussex with his wife, Margaret Fingerhut, the concert pianist.

Professional background 
In 1974, Tyler joined Unilever as a management trainee. He worked there at Birds Eye, Wall's Ice Cream, BOCM Silcock and at Unilever's London headquarters on corporate strategy and on its agribusiness activities. He also qualified with CIMA as a management accountant, later becoming a FCMA and also a member of the Association of Corporate Treasurers.

He then worked for National Westminster Bank as group financial controller and finance director of NatWest Investment Bank between 1986 and 1989, before being recruited as group finance director (CFO) by Christie's, spending seven years there, which included two in New York City as president of Christie's American business. This was followed by ten years at GUS from 1997 to 2006 as group finance director (CFO). During this period, GUS acquired Argos (retailer) and many Experian businesses, and divested a number of companies. Finally, it was split into three UK listed companies - Burberry, Experian and Home Retail Group. 

After the demerger of GUS, he entered into a plural career, becoming chair of 3i Quoted Private Equity Plc (2007–09), chair of Logica (2007–12), chair of J. Sainsbury plc (2009 to 2019), chair of Hammerson plc (2013 to 2020),, and chair of The White Company (2020-22). He has been a non-executive director of Burberry (2002 to 2015), Experian (2006 to 2012), Reckitt Benckiser (2007–09), and Rubix (2020-21).

Tyler is the chair of Domestic and General (2015 to date), chair designate of PZ Cussons (2022-date), chair of JoJo Maman Bébé (2022-date), and chair of retail technology company Imagr since 2021. He is also chair of the Government backed Parker Review on ethnic diversity in UK business, having been its co-chair previously (2015-22). Tyler was also chair of Hampstead Theatre. from 2012 to 2020,

References

1953 births
Living people
Alumni of Trinity Hall, Cambridge
British corporate directors
People educated at Rendcomb College
Sainsbury's people